Switzerland competed at the 2017 World Aquatics Championships in Budapest, Hungary from 14 July to 30 July.

Diving

Switzerland has entered 6 divers (three male and three female).

Men

Women

Mixed

Swimming

Swiss swimmers have achieved qualifying standards in the following events (up to a maximum of 2 swimmers in each event at the A-standard entry time, and 1 at the B-standard):

Synchronized swimming

Switzerland's synchronized swimming team consisted of 12 athletes (12 female).

Women

 Legend: (R) = Reserve Athlete

References

Nations at the 2017 World Aquatics Championships
Switzerland at the World Aquatics Championships
2017 in Swiss sport